Meander is Carbon Leaf's first album. It was released in 1995 by the band's own label, Constant Ivy Records.

Track listing
"Directional" - 3:39
"Clockwork" - 3:55
"One Day" - 3:46
"Weird Guy Haus" - 2:53
"Kettle" - 3:51
"Skeleton Man Dance" - 4:51
"Strain" - 3:54
"Paper Thin" - 4:24
"Live Like You" - 4:57
"Country Monkee" - 4:21
"Winter's Dream" - 3:40
"Shellfish" - 5:01

1995 albums
Carbon Leaf albums